Vladimir Mitrofanovich Arnoldi (Kozlov (Michurinsk), Russia (1871–1924)) was a Russian professor of biology. He was a Corresponding Member of Russian Academy of Sciences and scientifically listed a number of valuable plants of Malaysia.

He lived in the Russian city of Tambov for much of his life. His son Konstantin Arnoldi became a prominent entomologist.

He is honoured in the name of Arnoldiella, which is a genus of green algae in the family Pithophoraceae.

References

1871 births
1924 deaths
20th-century Russian botanists
Corresponding Members of the Russian Academy of Sciences (1917–1925)
Academic staff of Moscow State University
19th-century botanists from the Russian Empire